National Road 43 or State Highway 43 is a  highway of eastern Burma, passing through Shan State.

Roads in Myanmar
Shan State